is a 1994 Japanese film directed by Tatsumi Kumashiro.

Awards and nominations
37th Blue Ribbon Awards
 Won: Best Film
 Won: Best Director – Tatsumi Kumashiro
 Won: Best Actor – Eiji Okuda
19th Hochi Film Award 
 Won: Best Director – Tatsumi Kumashiro

References

External links 

1994 films
Films directed by Tatsumi Kumashiro
1990s Japanese-language films
1990s Japanese films